Ellerdine Halt railway station was a station in Cold Hatton, Shropshire, England. The station was opened in 1930 and closed in 1963. The station was named for the nearby hamlet of Ellerdine.

References

Further reading

Disused railway stations in Shropshire
Railway stations in Great Britain opened in 1930
Railway stations in Great Britain closed in 1963
Former Great Western Railway stations